Daniel Samek (born 19 February 2004) is a Czech professional footballer who plays as a defender or midfielder for Italian  club Lecce.

Club career
Samek began his career at Hradec Králové, joining Slavia Prague's academy in 2018. On 3 March 2021, Samek made his debut for Slavia Prague, coming on as a 70th minute substitute in a 10–3 Czech Cup win against Slavia Karlovy Vary, becoming the youngest player in the club's history. On 23 May 2021, Samek made his league debut for Slavia Prague, starting in a 1–1 draw against Jablonec. On 22 August 2021, Samek scored his first goal for Slavia, scoring the second goal in a 4–0 win against Baník Ostrava. Samek also assisted the opening goal for Stanislav Tecl during the tie.

On 30 July 2022, Samek signed a five-year contract with Lecce in Italy.

International career
Samek has represented the Czech Republic at under-15, under-16 and under-19 level.

Style of play
Former Italian international Stefano Torrisi has described Samek as a "modern midfielder" who is "physically well built". Samek has been compared to Czech Republic captain Tomáš Souček and Barcelona midfielder Frenkie de Jong as a result of his "offensive and defensive actions", "good dribbling" and "good passing technique".

Career statistics

Club

References

External links
 

People from Beroun District
2004 births
Living people
Czech footballers
Association football defenders
Association football midfielders
Czech Republic youth international footballers
SK Slavia Prague players
Czech First League players
Sportspeople from the Central Bohemian Region
U.S. Lecce players
Czech expatriate footballers
Expatriate footballers in Italy
Czech expatriate sportspeople in Italy